The phrase Ruse blood wedding usually refers to a 1910 conflict among ethnic groups and the army in Ruse, Bulgaria, resulting in the deaths of 24 people; 70 others were injured. The clashes were caused by the wedding of a Bulgarian man and an ethnic Turkish girl, of which the local Turks disapproved and state authorities violently opposed.

Incident 
On 24 February 1910 Yordan Stefanov (Archaic ) and Saafet obtained permission to marry from a doctor, as Saafet was "mentally healthy" and claimed to be 18 years old. Saafet decided to adopt a Slavic name — Ruska. On the next day, her father, who was a hodzha (a priest), expressed his protest before the mayor, along with other Muslims. The court revoked the marriage permission on 27 February 1910, and ordered that the girl be returned to her parents, so she returned to their house until the evening. At night, a crowd of "adventurers" gathered in front of Saafet's house with the intention to "steal" her and set her free. The authorities responded by moving the girl to a police station, but could not cope with the approximately 1000 people, and Saafet eventually married Yordan on the 28th. Their wedding was celebrated by many on the central square, as this was the first Sunday before Lent, and a traditional fancy-dress carnival was held.

The local police officer, who also attended the carnival, was mocked for not being able to keep Saafet in the police station. Half an hour later, he called up support from the cavalry, and after some mutual verbal insults, the citizens and the military started a fight. There were 24 dead and about 70 injured after the clashes. At first, the police attempted to cover up the story by restricting communications to and from Ruse, but it soon became the top news in newspapers all over the country.

Political context 
Reactions varied — some blamed the police, while others blamed the government for giving the orders, and claimed that the police only did what it should. The socialist party stated that that was just a "stupid love comedy" which should not have ended as it did.

The wedding posed a difficult problem to Tsar Ferdinand I of Bulgaria, who had already planned to have a meeting with Sultan Abdul Hamid II. The relations between Ferdinand and the Sublime Porte were tense after he became a self-declared tsar (former knyaz). The Turkish diplomats in Bulgaria insisted that not returning the girl to her parents would have been an insult to their religion, so that could have been the major factor which influenced the government's orders to guard Saafet "at any cost".

Folklore 
The event is popularly perceived as an example of both ethnic intolerance in a multi-cultural urban society, and the prevalence of emotion over descent.

Several versions of a folk song, inspired by the blood wedding, can be heard in the Ruse, Veliko Tarnovo, and Varna regions. A song from Turkish folklore in those regions is also known to be based on this story.

Sources 
 

Blood wedding
Conflicts in 1910
Massacres in Bulgaria
1910 in Bulgaria
1910 riots